Zagorje is a settlement in Karlovac County, Croatia, and is a suburb of Ogulin

A village of the same name was mentioned in the Modrus Feudal Law. Zagorje is the traditional name for the valley south of the artificial Lake Sabljaci. However, today, the region is divided into several villages.

Between Zagorje and neighboring village Desmerice is the water source of Zagorska Mrežnica.

According to the population census of 2001, Zagorje consisted of 127 residents and 51 family households.

Sources
2001 Ogulin Census
The Official Website of Ogulin

Populated places in Karlovac County